The German Roughhaired Pointer, the Deutscher Stichelhaariger Vorstehhund in German, is a medium-sized breed of pointing dog developed in Germany.

History 
In the early 19th-century there were several varieties of rough-haired pointers found throughout Germany, with few attempts at standardising them as breeds. At some point in the development of the German Roughhaired Pointer old German shepherd dog blood was introduced; the word stichelhaariger in the breed name translates to rough-haired, reflective of this blood. Nearly extinct by the middle of the century the Roughhaired Pointer was saved through the efforts of a single breeder and in the second half of the century serious attempts were made to standardise the type and by the end of the century it was accepted as a district breed.

The German Roughhaired Pointer has never been as popular as the other German pointer breeds and is rarely if ever seen outside of Germany.

Description 
The German Roughhaired Pointer is a medium-sized breed, their appearance is very similar to the more numerous German Wirehaired Pointer and the Wirehaired Pointing Griffon, their overall appearance is robust without being overly heavy.

The principal difference between the breed and the German Wirehaired Pointer is the head, it differs in being heavier and broader, something it inherited from its shepherd forbears; it has hanging ears and particularly long eyebrows which give it an almost threatening appearance.

The breed known to be particularly aggressive towards predatory animals and very wary of strangers.

See also
 Dogs portal
 List of dog breeds

References 

Gundogs
FCI breeds
Dog breeds originating in Germany
Rare dog breeds